Shelby Lee Adams (born October 24, 1950) is an American environmental portrait photographer and artist best known for his images of Appalachian family life.

Life and career
Adams has photographed Appalachian families since the mid-1970s. He had first encountered the poor families of the Appalachian mountains as a child, travelling around the area with his uncle, who was a doctor. His work has been published in three monographs: Appalachian Portraits (1993), Appalachian Legacy (1998), and Appalachian Lives (2003).

The True Meaning of Pictures
Adams was the subject of a documentary film by Jennifer Baichwal in 2002 - The True Meaning of Pictures: Shelby Lee Adams's Appalachia. This was shown at the Toronto International Film Festival, and at the Sundance Festival in 2003. The film critiques and defends Adams' method in photographing Appalachian people for his previously published books.

Awards
2010 Guggenheim Fellowship

Books by Adams
Appalachian Portraits. Jackson: University Press of Mississippi, 1993. ; .
Appalachian Legacy: Photographs. Jackson: University Press of Mississippi, 1998. ; .
Appalachian Lives. Jackson: University Press of Mississippi, 2003. .
Salt and Truth. Richmond, Va.: Candela, 2011. .

Permanent collections
Art Institute of Chicago, Chicago
Museum of Contemporary Photography, Chicago
International Center of Photography, New York City
Musée de l'Élysée, Lausanne
Museum of Modern Art, New York
Fogg Museum, Cambridge, Massachusetts
National Gallery of Canada, Ottawa
San Francisco Museum of Modern Art
Smithsonian American Art Museum, Washington, DC
Stedelijk Museum, Amsterdam
Time Life Collection, Rockefeller Center, New York
Victoria and Albert Museum, London
Whitney Museum of American Art, New York
Middle Tennessee State University, Murfreesboro

References

External links
Adams's website
 2002.

1950 births
Living people
Appalachian studies
People from Perry County, Kentucky
Photographers from Kentucky